Khonj (also known as Khunj and Khunji) is a city and capital of Khonj County, Fars Province, Iran. From the 2006 census, its population was 19,347, in 3,353 families. Khonj was traditionally part of the region of Irahistan. The people of Khonj are native Persians of Zoroastrian origin who converted to Sunni Islam.

Its history goes back to 2,000 years, and Khonjis were known to be followers of Zoroastrianism. Khonjis refer to themselves as Khodmooni, a term literally meaning "part of ourselves" but figuratively used to refer to people from Gerash, Lar, Evaz, Khonj and other neighboring cities that share the Achomi language. The ancient names for Khonj were Hong and Konj (corner in Persian) and over time it has changed to Khonj. Its residents are Sunni, unlike most of Iran, and are famous as traders. The city has historical significance as it was the home for many Muslim scholars and great architects before and after Islam. Ibn Battuta, the great Moroccan explorer, wrote about his travels to Khonj in great detail.

The agriculture in Khonj is primarily wheat, oat, and dates. Khonj has the least amount of rainfall than any other part of Fars.

Climate 
The city of Khonj is located at 27.890 degrees east latitude and 53.437 degrees north of the Greenwich meridian. It is bounded by Lamerd and Mehr counties from the south, Qir, Kazerun and Jahrom counties from the north, Larestan county from the northeast, and Evaz county from the east. Khonj is located at the beginning of a vast plain in the southern Zagros mountains. Its distance to the Persian Gulf is 90 km and Its height is 1044 meters. Khonj faces hot weather most days of the year. But at the same time, it is one of the rainiest areas of Fars province.

Historical monuments 
The city of Khonj is considered one of the most significant historical cities of Fars province with more than 20 historical works from different periods that have been registered in the Iran National Heritage List. The works that have been identified so far include the pottery period of the Neolithic and the first millennium BC (Tel Khandaq, Kurde village, Tell Gap, Baghan village, Tell Korki and the six sites of Garmasht village) until today.

References

Populated places in Khonj County
Cities in Fars Province